Dhungaloo (Dungaloo) is a possibly extinct Australian Aboriginal language of Queensland. Bowern suggests that it may have been a Maric language. However, AIATSIS has no listing for the name.

References

Maric languages
Spurious languages
Languages extinct in the 2010s
Extinct languages of Queensland
2012 disestablishments in Australia